Akron Post Office and Federal Building is a historic former post office building in Akron, Ohio. It was listed in the National Register of Historic Places in 1983

The building was begun in 1927 and completed in 1929 to the designs of US Treasury architects under Acting Supervising Architect James A. Wetmore. The building is an example of Beaux-Arts architecture. It has not been used as a post office since 1975.

References 

Federal buildings in the United States
Buildings and structures in Akron, Ohio
Post office buildings on the National Register of Historic Places in Ohio
National Register of Historic Places in Summit County, Ohio
Office buildings in Akron, Ohio